Cris Shale (born June 27, 1968) is a former American football player for Bowling Green University and the Washington Redskins.

Shale became the most decorated player in Bowling Green football history after the 1990 season, earning spots on five different All-America teams. He was honored on the first-team by the AP, Football News and the AFCA, and second-team by the UPI and The Sporting News. He was selected to the 1990 College Football All-America Team.

In the 1990 season, Shale set four Mid-American Conference records, including season (46.77) and career (43.09) punting average. Shale was inducted to the BGSU Athletic Hall of Fame in 1996.

He was drafted by the Washington Redskins in 1991 in Round 10 (#270 Overall). While with the Redskins he compiled no statistics.

Shale works in Operations & Quality Management in Belvidere, Illinois.

References 

NFL Statistics
LINKED-IN Bio
NFL.com

1968 births
Living people
American football punters
Washington Redskins players
Bowling Green Falcons football players
People from Beavercreek, Ohio
Players of American football from Ohio